Romos is a commune in Hunedoara County, Transylvania, Romania. It is composed of five villages: Ciungu Mare (Csunzshavas), Pișchinți (Piskinc), Romos, Romoșel (Romoszhely) and Vaidei (Vajdej).

References

Communes in Hunedoara County
Localities in Transylvania